Vallfogona may refer to several places in Catalonia, Spain:
 Vallfogona de Balaguer
 Vallfogona de Ripollès
 Vallfogona de Riucorb
 Vallfogona, in the municipality of La Pobla de Lillet